Sutter Health Park is the home ballpark of the Sacramento River Cats Minor League Baseball team, which is a member of the Pacific Coast League. Known as Raley Field from 2000 to 2019, the facility was built on the site of old warehouses and rail yards in West Sacramento, California, across the Sacramento River from the California State Capitol. It is directly adjacent to downtown Sacramento.

History
The $46.5 million stadium was built in eight-and-a-half months, but extended periods of bad weather forced the River Cats on a season-opening one month-long road trip, as completion was delayed 45 days. The completion time however was estimated to be about two years. The home opener was played on May 15, 2000.

The stadium is one of the few professional sports facilities in the nation built without a public sector contribution. Although constructed using bonds financed by the River City Stadium Financing Authority, bond payments are paid from ticket, concession, advertising, and other revenues, not taxes. Because the $46.5 million project cost was too large for the host city to finance, Christopher Cabaldon, in his first term as Mayor of West Sacramento, recruited Sacramento County and Yolo County to join his city in a joint-powers agency which became the stadium financing authority. Because of the success of the stadium, its private revenue sources have been more than sufficient to repay the construction bonds and build a bond reserve.

The stadium has 10,624 permanent seats and grass berms in both right and left field for a total capacity of 14,014. Its original capacity was 14,611 and was decreased to 14,414 in 2005 with the addition of a party deck. It further decreased in 2010 with the opening of the Diamond Club behind home plate. The stadium has 2,798 club seats and 750 seats in 36 suites.

The naming rights for the facility were sold to Raley's, a regional chain of supermarkets which is also based in West Sacramento, for $15 million over 20 years. The stadium was not designed with expansion in mind; therefore, if a major league ballclub ever moved to Sacramento there would be significant work required.

The ballpark hosted the 2005 Triple-A All-Star Game in which the Pacific Coast League All-Stars defeated the International League All-Stars, 11–5.

There was discussion of the Sacramento Mountain Lions, an American football team in the United Football League, using the field during the 2012 season. A final agreement to this effect was announced on August 6, 2012. The UFL, including the Mountain Lions, abruptly shut down operations in the middle of the 2012 season.

On July 18, 2013, Raley Field hosted a soccer match, a friendly featuring Mexican side Dorados de Sinaloa and Premier League side Norwich City F.C. The game finished 3–0 to Norwich, with goals from Luciano Becchio, Anthony Pilkington and Josh Murphy. The match's attendance was 14,014.

As part of the Golden State Hockey Rush, Raley Field hosted a minor league hockey game between the Stockton Heat and the Bakersfield Condors of the American Hockey League on December 18, 2015.

The ballpark was renamed Sutter Health Park before the 2020 season as part of a naming rights agreement with Sacramento-based Sutter Health.

Gallery

References

External links

Official Website
Sacramento River Cats – Sutter Health Park
Ballpark Digest's Visit to Raley Field
Raley Field View - Ball Parks of the Minor Leagues

Baseball venues in California
Ice hockey venues in California
Outdoor ice hockey venues in the United States
Sports venues in Sacramento County, California
Sports venues in Yolo County, California
West Sacramento, California
American football venues in California
Minor league baseball venues
Sacramento Mountain Lions stadiums
Sacramento River Cats
United Football League (2009–2012) venues
2000 establishments in California
Sports venues completed in 2000
Pacific Coast League ballparks